Bigg Boss 1 is the first season of the Telugu-language version of the Indian reality television series Bigg Boss. was premiered on 16 July 2017 on Star Maa. Jr NTR hosted the show. For this season of Bigg Boss, a lavish house set was constructed in Lonavala. Siva Balaji was the winner. The prize money for the winner was Rs. 50 lakhs (5,000,000 or 50,00,000).

Housemates
The participants in the order they entered the house are:
! Entered

Original Entrants
 Archana Shastry — Film actress

 Sameer Hasan — Film actor
 Mumaith Khan — Film actress
 Prince Cecil — Film actor
 Madhu Priya — Singer
 Jyothi Lakshmi — Film actress
 Siva Balaji — Film actor
 Kalpana Raghavendar — Singer
 Mahesh Kathi — Movie critic
 Kathi Karthika — Television presenter
 Sampoornesh Babu— Film actor
 Aadarsh Balakrishna — Film actor
 Hari Teja — Film actress
 Dhanraj — Comedian

Wild Card entries

 Diksha Panth — Film actress
 Navdeep Pallapolu — Film actor

Reception
The Bigg Boss Telugu program is regarded as one of the most expensive Telugu television shows. The launch of season 1 opened with 16.18 TVR and became the most watched Telugu television show.

References

External links
 Official website at Hotstar
 NTR's Big Boss Telugu promo videos

2017 Indian television seasons
01